A non-functional pad is a pad in a printed circuit board that is not connected to a track on the layer it is on.

Removal 
Non-functional pads can be removed at any phase of the design process. Some software allows precise control during the design process, and also removes the non-functional pads during output file creation. Furthermore, some board manufacturers remove non-functional pads during data preparations. 

Occasionally, this process of non-functional pad removal is also called unused pad suppression.

The benefits of removing the non-functional pads are limited. Electrically, it creates needless extra capacitance in certain designs, which needs to be removed. Removing non-functional pads can improve the drilling process, as it lessens drill wear.  

Non-functional pad removal can influence the reliability. (e.g. barrel cracking failure mode).  Removal can increase or decrease reliability. Depending on design parameters, removing the non-functional pads can free up routing space. 

Non-functional pads naturally also affect thermal characteristics.

Sometimes, non-functional pads (or their removal) are used for copper balancing, which affects etching, bow and twist and other effects.

Bibliography 
 Non-functional Pads: Should They Stay or Should They Go
 Pads/Nopads

Printed circuit board manufacturing